Franco Daniel Benítez (born 14 June 1991) is an Argentine professional footballer who plays as a midfielder for Excursionistas.

Career
Benítez started his career with Nueva Chicago. He made one appearance in the 2011–12 Primera B Metropolitana campaign as they won promotion via the play-offs. Benítez was sent off on his Primera B Nacional debut in March 2013 versus Sarmiento, though soon returned to appear nine times as the club suffered relegation back to the third tier. Benítez remained for two more seasons, the first of which ended as title winners, before leaving in 2015 to Sacachispas. Two goals in twenty-eight came in Primera C Metropolitana. January 2016 saw Benítez join Deportivo Merlo. He scored six goals in two years there.

On 17 August 2018, Benítez completed a move to Primera B Metropolitana's Deportivo Español. He didn't appear competitively until May 2019, though would subsequently play two hundred and seventy minutes across fixtures with Justo José de Urquiza, Colegiales and Comunicaciones; as they were relegated to tier four. Benítez spent 2019–20 with Deportivo Laferrere, before moving across Primera C Metropolitana to rejoin Deportivo Merlo in July 2020.

Career statistics
.

Honours
Nueva Chicago
Primera B Metropolitana: 2013–14

References

External links

1991 births
Living people
Footballers from Buenos Aires
Argentine footballers
Association football midfielders
Primera B Metropolitana players
Primera Nacional players
Primera C Metropolitana players
Nueva Chicago footballers
Sacachispas Fútbol Club players
Deportivo Merlo footballers
Deportivo Español footballers
Deportivo Laferrere footballers
CA Excursionistas players